Aurora James is a Canadian creative director, activist, and fashion designer. In 2013, she founded the fashion label Brother Vellies, with the goal of promoting traditional African design practices and techniques. In 2020, James founded the 15 Percent Pledge as a non-profit organization to support Black-owned businesses.

Early life 

James was born to a Ghanaian father and Canadian mother in Guelph, Ontario, Canada. Her childhood was split between Canada and Jamaica. In 2010, James relocated to Los Angeles and later to New York City.

Career and brand

After traveling across Africa in 2011, James spent the next few years experimenting with design, testing designs at local markets in New York and working with various artisan groups. She launched Brother Vellies in January 2013, started with $3,500 in savings, with a goal of promoting the work of African artisans. The first formal Brother Vellies collection was produced for the spring 2014 season and was created entirely with shoemakers in South Africa. James later expanded to working in other countries within Africa and beyond, including Mexico and Honduras, to continue producing desert boots, shoes, slippers, and sandals.

In 2015, James began producing handbags for Brother Vellies, the same year she won the CFDA/Vogue Fashion Fund prize.

In 2020, James was featured on the cover of the September issue of Vogue magazine, in a portrait by Jordan Casteel.

Brother Vellies has been worn by activists, celebrities, artists and musicians, including Beyoncé, Solange Knowles, Nicki Minaj, and Elaine Welteroth. James designed the "Tax the Rich" dress worn by Alexandria Ocasio-Cortez at the 2021 Met Gala.

The 15 Percent Pledge

In 2020, in the wake of the murder of George Floyd and the wave of Black Lives Matter activism that followed, James launched an initiative called the 15 Percent Pledge, with an Instagram post on May 29 that Vogue writes "immediately went viral and resulted in an outpouring of interest." The 15 Percent Pledge Foundation was then created as a non-profit organization to urge major retailers to commit 15 percent of their shelf-space to Black-owned businesses. The foundation offers large corporations accountability and strategy suggestions as well as consulting services. The goal of the foundation is to advocate on behalf of Black-owned businesses and to build generational wealth in Black communities; according to its website, the initiative "was born from seeing multiple acts of social injustice and police brutality in the United States, with a lack of corporate accountability for the systemic issues at play."

Time magazine writes that James wanted to "find a way that companies could make a tangible change", and "from there, the 15 Percent Pledge was born."  Cam Wolf writes in GQ magazine that "James is careful to note that the 15 Percent Pledge is not the only solution", and that James said, "This is a really tough time for everyone, and people shopping is by no means going to ease the pain of the lives that we have lost ... There are also a lot of other things that we need people to be doing, like donating to bail funds."

Awards and honors

 2015 CFDA/Vogue Fashion Fund – Winner
 2016 Inductee to the Council of Fashion Designers of America (CFDA)
 2016 CFDA Awards, Swarovski Award for Accessory Design – Nominee
 2016 Vogue Talents Award – Winner
 2016-2018 CFDA Fashion Incubator Member
 2018 CFDA Awards, Swarovski Award for Emerging Talent – Nominee
 2019 Planned Parenthood Influencer Award
 2019 CAFA Award: International Canadian Designer Award – Winner
 2019, Crain's New York Business 40 Under 40
 2020 British Fashion Award, People
 2020 The Bloomberg 50
 2020 Footwear News Person of the Year
 2021 Time 100, Times annual list of the 100 most influential people in the world

References

External links
 Brother Vellies website

Living people
Activists from Ontario
Canadian art directors
Canadian fashion designers
Canadian women activists
Canadian women in business
Canadian people of Ghanaian descent
Black Canadian businesspeople
Canadian businesspeople in fashion
People from Guelph
Canadian women fashion designers
1984 births